Raimondo di Sangro, Prince of Sansevero (30 January 1710 – 22 March 1771) was an Italian nobleman, inventor, soldier, writer, scientist, alchemist and freemason best remembered for his reconstruction of the Sansevero Chapel in Naples.

Early life
The seventh Prince of San Severo was born in Torremaggiore into a noble family.  His father was Antonio, Duke of Torremaggiore, and his mother was Cecilia Gaetani of Aragon.  His mother died shortly after his birth.  From the age of ten he was educated at the Jesuit College in Rome.

Career
In 1730, at the age of 20, he returned to Naples.  He became a friend of Charles Bourbon, who became king of Naples in 1734, for whom he invented a waterproof cape . 

In 1744 he distinguished himself at the head of a regiment during the Battle of Velletri, in the war between the Habsburgs and the Bourbons. While in command of the military he built a cannon out of lightweight materials which had a longer range than the standard ones of the time, and wrote a military treatise on the employment of infantry (Manuale di esercizi militari per la fanteria) for which he was praised by Frederick II of Prussia.

His real interests, however, were the studies of alchemy, mechanics and the sciences in general. Among his inventions were:

 An hydraulic device that could pump water to any height
 An "eternal flame", using chemical compounds of his own invention
 A carriage with wood and cork "horses" which, driven by a cunning system of paddlewheels, could travel on both land and water
 Coloured fireworks
 A printing press which could print different colours in a single impression.

Publishing
The Prince spoke several European languages, as well as Arabic and Hebrew. After returning to Naples he set up a printing press in the basement of his house where he printed both his own works and those of others, some of which he translated himself. As some of these were censored by the ecclesiastical authorities he also wrote anonymously. Some of his publications were clearly influenced by Freemasonry, and he communicated with fellow masons such as the Scot Andrew Michael Ramsay, whose Voyages of Cyrus he translated and published, and the English poet Alexander Pope, whose Rape of the Lock he translated and published (although, due to condemnations by the Jesuits, he had to deny these activities). He was head of the Neapolitan masonic lodge until he was excommunicated by the Church, making an enemy of the Neapolitan cardinal Giuseppe Spinelli. The excommunication was later revoked by Pope Benedict XIV, probably on account of the influence of the di Sangro family.

Whilst in Naples, he forged a friendship with Fortunato-Bartolommeo de Félice, 2nd Count di Panzutti, who had been appointed chair of experimental physics and mathematics at Naples University by Celestino Galiani and later set up the famous publishing press at Yverdon in 1762. Together the Prince and the Count translated the physicist John Arbuthnot's works from Latin.

Rumours
Many legends grew up around his alchemical activities: that he could create blood out of nothing, that he could replicate the liquefaction of blood of San Gennaro, that he had people killed so that he could use their bones and skin for experiments. The Sansevero Chapel was said to have been constructed on an old temple of Isis, and di Sangro was said to have been a Rosicrucian. To justify this, locals pointed to a massive Statue of the God of the Nile, located just around the corner from his home. 

To add to the sense of dread, di Sangro's family home in Naples, the Palazzo Sansevero, was the scene of a brutal murder at the end of the 16th century, when the composer Carlo Gesualdo caught his wife and her lover in flagrante delicto, and hacked them to death in their bed.

Later life
The last years of his life were dedicated to decorating the Sansevero Chapel with marble works from the greatest artists of the time, including Antonio Corradini, Francesco Queirolo, and Giuseppe Sanmartino (whose Veiled Christ'''s detailed marble veil was thought by many to be created by di Sangro's alchemy) and preparing anatomical models. Two of the models, known as anatomical machines, are still on display in the Chapel, and have given rise to legends as to how they were constructed (even today the exact method is not known). Until recently many Neapolitans believed that the models were of his servant and a pregnant woman, into whose veins an artificial substance was injected under pressure, but the latest research has shown that the models are artificial. 

He destroyed his own scientific archive before he died. After his death, his descendants, under threat of excommunication by the Church due to di Sangro's involvement with Freemasonry and alchemy, destroyed what was left of his writings, formulae, laboratory equipment and results of experiments.

Death
Raimondo di Sangro died in Naples in 1771, his death being hastened by the continuous use of dangerous chemicals in his experiments and inventions. In 1794, the Swedish naturalist Carl Peter Thunberg named the plant genus Sansevieria after him.

References

Francesco Paolo de Ceglia, https://www.academia.edu/44175505/THE_FANTASTIC_ANATOMY_OF_RAIMONDO_DE_SANGRO_PRINCE_OF_SANSEVERO , La Medicina nei Secoli'' 32 (2020)

External links
 Sansevero Chapel Website 
 Video of the Sansevero Chapel 
 Raimondo di Sangro VII Prince of Sansevero 
 Neapolitan Aristocracy - The Family of di Sangro 

1710 births
1771 deaths
People temporarily excommunicated by the Catholic Church
People from the Province of Foggia
Italian Freemasons
Italian nobility
18th-century Italian scientists
18th-century Italian inventors
Italian male writers
Cappella Sansevero